Attempted Mustache is the fourth album from Loudon Wainwright III. It was recorded in Nashville, Tennessee with producer Bob Johnston and was released in 1973 on Columbia Records.

Wainwright said that "I Am the Way" was partly inspired by Guru Maharaj Ji's appearance at the Millennium '73 festival in December 1973.

Johnny Cash covered the song "The Man Who Couldn't Cry" live on his album American Recordings.

Track listing 
All songs written by Loudon Wainwright III; except where indicated
 "The Swimming Song" – 2:26
 "A.M. World" – 2:31
 "Bell Bottom Pants" – 2:27
 "Liza" – 2:47
 "I Am the Way (New York Town)" (based on "New York Town", music by Woody Guthrie; new title and lyrics by Loudon Wainwright III) – 3:12
 "Clockwork Chartreuse" – 3:37
 "Down Drinking at the Bar" – 3:55
 "The Man Who Couldn't Cry" – 6:16
 "Come a Long Way" (Kate McGarrigle) – 2:45
 "Nocturnal Stumblebutt" – 3:45
 "Dilated to Meet You" – 2:02
 "Lullaby" – 2:55

Personnel 
 Loudon Wainwright III - acoustic guitar, banjo, vocals
 Kenneth Buttrey - drums
 Johnny Christopher - acoustic guitar, electric guitar
 Tommy Cogbill - bass
 Ron Cornelius - acoustic guitar, electric guitar
 Mac Gayden - acoustic guitar, electric guitar, slide guitar
 Reggie Young - acoustic guitar, electric guitar
 Hargus "Pig" Robbins - piano, organ
 Doug Kershaw - fiddle and Cajun exclamation
 Kate McGarrigle - banjo, vocal

Release history 
 LP: Columbia KC 32710 (U.S.)
 LP: CBS 65837 (UK)
 CD: Edsel EDCD269
 CD: Sony-Legacy 65257 (1998)

References 

Loudon Wainwright III albums
1973 albums
Albums produced by Bob Johnston
Columbia Records albums